Hans H. Steinberg is a German film, television, and stage actor, best known for his short role as Karl Koller in the film Downfall.

Life 
Steinberg trained as an actor at the West Coast Actors Studio in Vancouver. In 1993, Steinberg appeared in the series Der Fahnder and from this time on appeared in series such as Ein starkes Team, Marienhof, Die Rosenheim-Cops, SOKO 5113 and Sturm der Liebe, as well as in movies for TV and cinema. In the film Downfall, he played the short role of General der Flieger Karl Koller.

Steinberg is also active as a stage actor, in the season 2009/2010 his role in Schiller's drama The Robbers was Maximilian von Moor.

Before that he worked from 1983 to 1987 in the TIK-Theater in Munich and then went on tour with various pieces.

He also played in the Karl May Games in Bad Segeberg in 1993 and 1994. In the summer of 2014, Hans H. Steinberg participated in the Störtebeker Festival in Ralswiek on the island of Rügen.

Steinberg lives in Munich and speaks fluent German and English. He likes playing golf, horse riding, and tennis, and can play the guitar and piano.

Filmography

Film 
1959: Bevor der Blitz einschlägt
1987: Stadtrand
1988: Schade Josie
1990: The Indian
1993: 
1999: Almost
2004: Downfall - General Koller
2004: Off Beat - Einsatzleiter Feuerwehr
2011: The Evidence (Short) - Person
2014: Die Verantwortlichen
2015: Monopoly
2019: Die Goldfische - Herr Kowalczyk

Television 

1991: Hafendetektiv, ARD
1992: Sterne des Südens, ARD
1993: Blank Meier Jensen, ARD
1993: Der Fahnder, ARD
1994: Berlin Break, RTL
1994: Notärztin, Pro7
1995: Die Wache, RTL
1996: Aus heiterem Himmel, ZDF
1996: Ein starkes Team, ZDF
1997: Aus heiterem Himmel, ZDF
1998: Mobbing Girls, ARD
1999: Großstadtrevier, NDR
2000: Der Doc, SAT 1
2000: Absolut das Leben, ARD
2001: So schnell Du kannst, ZDF
2003: Rosenheim Cops, ZDF
2004: Klinikum Berlin Mitte, RTL
2006: SOKO 5113, ZDF
2007: Lilly Schönauer, ZDF
2007: Die Frauen der Parkallee, ZDF
2008: Soko 5113, ZDF
2009:/2008 Marienhof, ARD
2010: Sturm der Liebe, ARD
2012: Der Kaktus, ARD/ORF
2013: Die Chefin, ZDF
2015: Schon geerbt, ARD/Degeto
2016: Zwei Tänzer für Isolde, ARD/Degeto
2016: Das Ende der Romanows, ZDF
2017: Stuttgart Homicide, ZDF

Links 
 
 Hans H. Steinberg bei agentur-reimann.de
 Hans H. Steinberg bei filmmakers.de
Hans H. Steinberg showreel

References 

1950 births
Male actors from Munich
Living people
German male film actors
German male television actors
German male stage actors